Pakistan Super League is a professional Twenty20 cricket league, which is operated by Pakistan Cricket Board. It is contested between six franchises comprising cricketers from Pakistan and around the world.

The musical anthems for the league have been released to promote the tournament in media, and anthems for every team to promote their tournament performances.

Title anthems

Official anthems

Secondary anthems

2021 HBL PSL Taranay

Islamabad United

Karachi Kings

Lahore Qalandars

Multan Sultans

Peshawar Zalmi

Quetta Gladiators

See also
Music of Pakistan
Sport in Pakistan
List of songs about Pakistan

References

Super League anthems
Sporting songs
Anthems